The Wesel–Datteln Canal is a  long canal in North Rhine-Westphalia, Germany. It runs along the northern edge of the Ruhr Area, from the Rhine near Wesel to the Dortmund-Ems Canal near Datteln. It forms an important transport connection between the Lower Rhine and northern and eastern Germany, together with the parallel Rhine-Herne Canal.

It runs parallel to the river Lippe. The canal has six locks, at Friedrichsfeld, Hünxe, Dorsten, Flaesheim, Ahsen and Datteln. The main ports along the canal are in Marl (Chemiepark Marl and Auguste-Victoria).

References
Wasser- und Schifffahrtsamt Duisburg-Meiderich 

Canals in Germany
Federal waterways in Germany
Canals opened in 1930